No Deliverance is the third studio album by Toadies. It was released in 2008 on Kirtland Records. No Deliverance is the band's first album seven years after the band's previous album, Hell Below/Stars Above, and the first since the band's reunion in 2006. It is also the band's only album without an official bass player, with bass duties being handled by Vaden Todd Lewis.

The album was promoted by two singles, "No Deliverance" and "Song I Hate", the former which reached number 38 on the Mainstream Rock Airplay chart.

Release and reception
"No Deliverance" was made available for streaming on Spins website.

The album was released on CD, vinyl and for digital download.  While all versions contained ten tracks, the iTunes release included a bonus eleventh track, a cover of The Cure's "A Forest". Those who pre-ordered through Newbury Comics received an autographed CD booklet, while those who pre-ordered it through f.y.e. received an autographed poster.

 Commercial performance 
No Deliverance debuted at number 59 on the Billboard 200, selling 8,563 copies in its first week, and remained on the chart for two weeks. As of 2012, the album has sold 39,000 copies in the US.

 Reception 
The Austin Chronicle wrote that "the band's jaded alt-rock stomp still has an earthy appeal, as evidenced by slammers 'So Long Lovely Eyes' and 'Flower'." AllMusic wrote that the songs "successfully revisit the band’s mid-1990s post-grunge heyday, particularly on the urgent, Soundgarden-like opener, 'So Long Lovey Eyes'; the stinging title track; and the sinister stomper 'Hell in High Water'." Trouser Press thought that "Lewis/Vaden’s vocals are still strong, having changed very little since 1994."

Track listing

PersonnelToadies Todd Lewis - vocals, rhythm guitar, bass
 Mark Reznicek - drums
 Clark Vogeler - lead guitarProductionDavid Castell - Producer, Engineer, Digital Editing, Mixing, Audio Production
Mark Dufour  -	Digital Editing, Drum Technician
Michael Garcia - Assistant Engineer, Audio Engineer
Bart Rose - Assistant Engineer, Audio Engineer
Andy Sharp - Engineer, Audio EngineerArtwork'
Scogin Mayo - Photography
Tommy Moore - Package Design

Chart positions

Album

Singles

References

External links
Toadies official website

Toadies albums
2008 albums
Kirtland Records albums
Albums produced by David Castell